NBA CBA may refer to:

NBA Collective Bargaining Agreement, a labor agreement in the National Basketball Association
NBA–CBA relationship, the relationship between the National Basketball Association and the Continental Basketball Association